The areas of Sheffield, a city and metropolitan borough in the north of England, vary widely in size and history. Some of the areas developed from villages or hamlets, that were absorbed into Sheffield as the city grew, and thus their centres are well defined, but the boundaries of many areas are ambiguous. The areas of Sheffield do not play a significant administrative role, but the city is divided into 28 electoral wards for local elections and 6 parliamentary constituencies for national elections.

History
Prior to 1848 the parish of Sheffield was divided into six townships: Attercliff-cum-Darnall; Brightside Bierlow; Ecclesall Bierlow; Nether Hallam; Sheffield township; and Upper Hallam. In 1832 the new borough constituency of Sheffield was formed from these townships with the exception of most of Upper Hallam and parts of Ecclesall Bierlow. In 1843 the Municipal Borough of Sheffield was created from the whole of the six townships, becoming the City of Sheffield in 1893. The Sheffield constituency was broken into five divisions in 1885: Attercliffe; Brightside; Central; Ecclesall; and Hallam, with the addition of Hillsborough and Park constituencies in 1918 after the City extended its boundaries. The Central and Ecclesall constituencies were abolished in 1950 in favour of two new constituencies, Heeley and Neepsend, but the latter was abolished in 1955 and the former was replaced by a revived Central constituency in 1983.

Sheffield is divided into 28 electoral wards for the purposes of City Council elections. The number of electors per ward was set at about 13,500 ± 10% in 2004, following a Local Government ward boundary review.

Sheffield is currently covered by six parliamentary constituencies, each formed from a number of wards; Brightside and Hillsborough, Central, Hallam, Heeley, South East, and Penistone and Stocksbridge, which also includes parts of the Metropolitan Borough of Barnsley.

Areas of Sheffield by ward

Park & Arbourthorne
Arbourthorne, Gleadless, Gleadless Townend, Hollinsend, Newfield Green, Norfolk Park and Ridgeway
Beauchief and Greenhill
Beauchief, Batemoor, Greenhill, Jordanthorpe, Low Edges and Meadow Head
Beighton
Beighton, Hackenthorpe, Owlthorpe and Sothall
Birley
Base Green, Birley, Charnock Hall, Frecheville and parts of Hackenthorpe
Broomhill & Sharrow Vale
Broomhill, Crookesmoor, Endcliffe and Tapton
Burngreave
Burngreave, Fir Vale, Grimesthorpe, Pitsmoor, Shirecliffe and Woodside
City
Broomhall, Kelham Island, Highfield, Little Sheffield, Sharrow and the City Centre
Crookes & Crosspool
Crookes, Crosspool and Sandygate
Darnall
Attercliffe, Carbrook, Darnall, Tinsley and part of Handsworth
Dore and Totley
Bradway, Dore, Totley and Whirlow
East Ecclesfield
Chapeltown, Colley and Ecclesfield
Ecclesall
Bents Green, Ecclesall, Greystones, Millhouses, Parkhead and Ringinglow
Firth Park
Firth Park and Longley
Fulwood
Fulwood, Lodge Moor and Ranmoor
Gleadless Valley
Gleadless Valley, Heeley, Hemsworth, Herdings, Hurlfield, Lowfield and Meersbrook
Graves Park
Norton, Norton Lees, Norton Woodseats and Woodseats
Hillsborough
Hillsborough, Malin Bridge, Owlerton, Wadsley and Wisewood
Manor Castle
Manor, Manor Park, Park Hill and Wybourn
Mosborough
Halfway, Holbrook, Mosborough, Plumbley, Waterthorpe and Westfield
Nether Edge & Sharrow
Brincliffe, Carter Knowle, Nether Edge and Sharrow Vale
Richmond
Four Lane Ends, Intake, Normanton Spring, Richmond and Woodthorpe
Shiregreen and Brightside
Brightside, Shiregreen and Wincobank
Southey
Birley Carr, Foxhill, Parson Cross, Southey and Wadsley Bridge
Stannington
High Bradfield, Low Bradfield, Dungworth, Loxley, Middlewood, Stannington, Strines, Woodland View and Worrall
Stocksbridge and Upper Don
Bolsterstone, Deepcar, Ewden, Midhopestones, Oughtibridge, Stocksbridge and Wharncliffe Side
Walkley
Langsett, Neepsend, Netherthorpe, Philadelphia, Upperthorpe and Walkley
West Ecclesfield
Burncross, Grenoside and High Green
Woodhouse
Handsworth, Orgreave and Woodhouse

Other areas
There are other areas that do not fit into the list above:
Abbeydale
Bradfield civil parish
Ecclesfield civil parish
Lower Don Valley, the historic East End of Sheffield
Stocksbridge town

References